The badminton men's team tournament at the 2019 Southeast Asian Games in Manila will be held from 1 to 4 December at the Muntinlupa Sports Complex,  Metro Manila, Philippines.

Schedule
All times are Philippines Standard Time (UTC+08:00)

Results

Quarter-finals

Semi-finals

Final

See also
Women's team tournament
Individual event

References

Men's team